Saint-Hilaire-Cottes is a commune in the Pas-de-Calais department in the Hauts-de-France region of France.

Geography

Population

Places of interest
 The church of St. Hilaire, dating from the sixteenth century.
 The church of St. Omer, at Cottes, dating from the fifteenth century.
 The Commonwealth War Graves Commission graves.

See also
Communes of the Pas-de-Calais department

References

External links

 The CWGC graves in the churchyard

Sainthilairecottes